Zagiridia alamotralis is a moth in the family Crambidae. It was described by Viette in 1973. It is found in Madagascar.

References

Moths described in 1973
Spilomelinae